The Săuzeni is a left tributary of the river Voinești in Romania. It flows into the Voinești in Cogeasca. Lakes Dumești I and Păușești, used mainly for fish farming are located on this river.

References

Rivers of Romania
Rivers of Iași County